Heavy Fruit is the fourth full-length studio album by American rock band He Is Legend and their first since coming back from hiatus in 2011. It was released on August 19, 2014 through Tragic Hero Records. It is the band's second album released on that label, after 2009's It Hates You.

Track listing

Personnel
He Is Legend
Schuylar Croom – vocals
Adam Tanbouz – guitars
Matty Williams – bass
Sam Huff – drums, percussion

Additional musicians
Bibis Ellison – vocals

Production
He Is Legend – producer
Mitchell Marlow – producer, engineer
Al Jacob – producer, engineer
Bob Marlette – mixing
John Nacherio – mastering

Illustration and design
Kate Sinclair – artwork
Carlos Perez & Garrison Lee – design

References

2014 albums
He Is Legend albums
Tragic Hero Records albums